Amin El-Esnawi (23 June 1936 – 28 May 2006) was an Egyptian footballer. He competed at the 1960 Summer Olympics and the 1964 Summer Olympics.

References

External links
 

1936 births
2006 deaths
Egyptian footballers
Egypt international footballers
Olympic footballers of Egypt
Footballers at the 1960 Summer Olympics
Footballers at the 1964 Summer Olympics
1962 African Cup of Nations players
1963 African Cup of Nations players
People from Suez
Association football defenders